Lotus Bridge is a cross-border bridge linking the Cotai reclamation area of Macau with Hengqin Island in Zhuhai, Guangdong Province, People's Republic of China (PRC). The bridge is a road crossing between mainland China and Macau. Since December 2014, it has been open 24 hours per day.

The bridge is located about 8 km (5 mi) west of the Macau International Airport. The bridge has three lanes in each direction and follows Macau's rule of the road of driving on the left. The approach roads to the bridge on the mainland Chinese side have an unusual arrangement to facilitate switching traffic to driving on the right in mainland China.
The bridge has been designed by Eng Nuno Costa (Profabril) and a Chinese company.

See also
 Transport in Macau

References

External links

 Google Maps

Bridges in Macau
China–Macau border crossings
Landmarks in Macau
1999 establishments in Macau